The Defence Headquarters Complex is a complex of buildings currently under construction at Akuregoda, Sri Jayawardenapura Kotte to house the Sri Lanka Armed Forces headquarters and offices of the Ministry of Defence.

History
Under the Colombo Master Plan of 1979 all government offices in Colombo are to be moved to the administrative capital of Sri Jayewardenepura, Kotte, enabling the release of high-value land in Colombo for commercial development. The headquarters of various defence institutions were separate and scattered across Colombo, resulting in great inefficiency and high-security zones amidst commercial areas, causing disturbance to the general public.

Thus Defence Headquarters Complex allows resources to be better utilised and provides defence personnel with a state of the art office complex. This increases operational, administrative and logistic efficiency and minimises the disturbances caused to civilians and economic activities. Construction commenced in 2011 with the parliamentary approval of  Rs. 20 billion allocation. In 2015, with the change of government, construction halted and allocated funds were taken over by the Treasury which caused construction delays.  

In November 2019, the Sri Lanka Army began moving its headquarters to the completed blocks 6 and 7.

In May 2021, Ministry of Defence shifted to the newly constructed Block 1 of Defence Headquarters Complex.

Complex
The Administrative Building Complex consist of eight nine-storey buildings. In addition there is another block of similar size separate from the administrative complex as a communications center alongside other buildings.

The Administrative Building Complex consist of,
 Block No. 1 - Ministry of Defence
 Block No. 2 - Ministry of Defence
 Block No. 3 - Sri Lanka Navy Headquarters
 Block No. 4 - Sri Lanka Air Force Headquarters
 Block No. 5 - Combined conference Space  
 Block No. 6 - Army Headquarters
 Block No. 7 - Army Headquarters
 Block No. 8 - Office of Chief Defence Staff
 Block No. 9 - Joint Operations Command (JOC) Headquarters

in addition the complex contains several independent buildings which include

 Communication Building and Signal Tower 
 Security Building
 Water Sump and Pump House
 Sewerage treatment plant
 Generator building

References

Buildings and structures in Sri Jayawardenepura Kotte
Military headquarters in Sri Lanka
Sri Lanka